Dermateopsis is a genus of fungi in the family Dermateaceae.

See also 

 List of Dermateaceae genera

References

External links 

 Dermateopsis at Index Fungorum

Dermateaceae genera